Lâm Ti Phông (born 1 February 1996) is a Vietnamese footballer who plays as a winger for V.League 1 club Đông Á Thanh Hóa.

Personal life
Lâm Ti Phông's name came from his father's fascination with Thai former professional footballer Natipong Sritong-In.

Honours
Sanna Khánh Hòa BVN
V.League 2 runner-up: 2014

References

External links
 

1996 births
Living people
Vietnamese footballers
Association football midfielders
V.League 1 players
People from Quảng Ngãi province
Competitors at the 2017 Southeast Asian Games
Khanh Hoa FC players
Southeast Asian Games competitors for Vietnam